Cyrtandra wawrae, the rockface cyrtandra, is a species of flowering plant in the family Gesneriaceae, native to Kauai, Hawaii. A shrub reaching , it is often found growing on rock walls.

Conservation 
It is listed as endangered on the IUCN Red List.

References

wawrae
Endemic flora of Hawaii
Plants described in 1883
Flora without expected TNC conservation status